Steam Whistle Brewing is an independent brewery in Toronto, Ontario, Canada. It was founded in 2000 by three former employees of Upper Canada Brewing Company after that company was bought out. The company celebrates Beer in Canada and produces only one style of its own beer, a Premium Pilsner holding true to their motto "Do one thing really, really, well". The company also produces New Belgium Brewing Company brands for the Canadian market.

The brewery occupies Bays 1–14 in the John Street Roundhouse building at Roundhouse Park. Built in 1929, it was previously the home of a Canadian Pacific Railway steam locomotive repair facility and operated as such until May 13, 1988. The John Street Roundhouse is designated a National Historic Site and is owned by the City of Toronto.

The company operates the annual Steam Whistle's Roundhouse Winter Craft Beer Festival (RHCBF).

The brewery was the first customer of renewable energy project, the Deep Lake Water Cooling System.

Awards
Steam Whistle has won several awards, including Canada's Best Managed Companies. In 2004, Steam Whistle Pilsner was voted best beer in the Greater Toronto Area at the Golden Tap Awards. Awards for product quality include a Silver for Steam Whistle Pilsner in the 2016 Ontario Brewing Awards, and a Gold medal at the 2012 Canadian Brewing Awards for their Steam Whistle Pilsner.

References

External links
 

Beer brewing companies based in Ontario
Food and drink companies based in Toronto
Manufacturing companies based in Toronto
Canadian companies established in 2000
Canadian beer brands